Kim Kamman Brodersen (born 3 February 1963) is a Danish former footballer who played as a goalkeeper. He made one appearances for the Denmark national team in 1993.

References

External links
 

1963 births
Living people
Danish men's footballers
Association football goalkeepers
Denmark international footballers
Danish Superliga players
Herfølge Boldklub players
Næstved Boldklub players
Lyngby Boldklub players
People from Aabenraa Municipality
Sportspeople from the Region of Southern Denmark